Bellview or Belview can refer to:


Places

United States
 Bellview, Florida, a census-designated place
 Bellview, Georgia, an unincorporated community
 Belview, Minnesota, a city
 Bellview, New Jersey, an unincorporated community
 Bellview, New Mexico, an unincorporated community
 Bellview, North Carolina, an unincorporated community

Ireland
 Belview, County Westmeath, Ireland - see List of townlands of County Meath
 Belview Port

Businesses
 Bellview Airlines, a Nigerian airline which operated from 1992 to 2009
 Bellview Airlines (Sierra Leone), which operated from 1995 until its license was revoked in 2008
 Bellview Winery, a winery in Atlantic County, New Jersey

Other uses
 Bellview School, near Pikeville, Tennessee, United States, a former rural schoolhouse, on the National Register of Historic Places

See also
 Bellevue (disambiguation)